"Shine On" is a song by Danish pop singer Christine Milton. It was released on 29 March 2004 as the third single from her debut album Friday.

Track listing
 "Shine On" (Single Version) – 3:26
 "Shine On" (Extended) – 6:29
 "Shine On" (Instrumental) – 3:26
 "So Addictive" – 3:01

Credits and personnel
Writers: Ulf Lindström, Johan Ekhé, Ana Johnsson
Producer, arrangement, recording and mixing: Ghost
Vocals: Christine Milton
Instruments: Ghost
Backing vocals: Szhirley, Christina Undhjem
Mastering: Björn Engelmann

Charts

References

External links
Shine On at Discogs

2004 singles
Christine Milton songs
Song recordings produced by Ghost (production team)
RCA Records singles
Songs written by Johan Ekhé
Songs written by Ulf Lindström
2004 songs